Rodovia Ariovaldo de Almeida Viana (SP-61) is a highway in the southeastern part of the state of São Paulo in Brazil. The highway begins in the urban area of Guarujá and passes through the municipality of Bertioga, and links Mogi das Cruzes with the Rodovia Dom Paulo Rolim Loreiro, SP-98. It's also known as Rodovia Guarujá-Bertioga and Estrada de Pernambuco.

References 

Highways in São Paulo (state)